The 1987–88 season was the 77th season in Hajduk Split’s history and their 42nd in the Yugoslav First League. Their 7th place finish in the 1986–87 season meant it was their 42nd successive season playing in the Yugoslav First League.

Competitions

Overall

Yugoslav First League

Classification

Results summary

Results by round

Matches

Yugoslav First League

Sources: hajduk.hr

Yugoslav Cup

Sources: hajduk.hr

Cup Winners' Cup

Source: hajduk.hr

Player seasonal records

Top scorers

Source: Competitive matches

Notes
1. Data for league attendance in most cases reflects the number of sold tickets and may not be indicative of the actual attendance.
2. Match abandoned due to crowd trouble and later voided. Therefore, the match was awarded to Marseille and was Hajduk banned 2 years from European competitions.

See also
1987–88 Yugoslav First League
1987–88 Yugoslav Cup

References

External sources
 1987–88 Yugoslav First League at rsssf.com
 1987–88 Yugoslav Cup at rsssf.com
 1987–88 European Cup Winners' Cup at rsssf.com

HNK Hajduk Split seasons
Hajduk Split